The Indian national cricket team visited Bangladesh in November 2000 to take part in the inaugural Test match played by the Bangladesh national cricket team, which India won by nine wickets. The tour consisted of the one-off Test match only. Bangladesh's Aminul Islam became the third batsman to make a century in their country's inaugural Test.

Squads

Only Test

References

External links
 Tour home at ESPNcricinfo

2000 in Indian cricket
2000 in Bangladeshi cricket
2000
International cricket competitions in 2000–01
Bangladeshi cricket seasons from 2000–01